The gravitational binding energy of a system is the minimum energy which must be added to it in order for the system to cease being in a gravitationally bound state. A gravitationally bound system has a lower (i.e., more negative) gravitational potential energy than the sum of the energies of its parts when these are completely separated—this is what keeps the system aggregated in accordance with the minimum total potential energy principle.

For a spherical body of uniform density, the gravitational binding energy U is given by the formula

where G is the gravitational constant, M is the mass of the sphere, and R is its radius.

Assuming that the Earth is a sphere of uniform density (which it is not, but is close enough to get an order-of-magnitude estimate) with M =  and r = , then U = . This is roughly equal to one week of the Sun's total energy output.

The actual depth-dependence of density, inferred from seismic travel times (see Adams–Williamson equation), is given in the Preliminary Reference Earth Model (PREM). Using this, the real gravitational binding energy of Earth can be calculated numerically as U = .

According to the virial theorem, the gravitational binding energy of a star is about two times its internal thermal energy in order for hydrostatic equilibrium to be maintained.  As the gas in a star becomes more relativistic, the gravitational binding energy required for hydrostatic equilibrium approaches zero and the star becomes unstable (highly sensitive to perturbations), which may lead to a supernova in the case of a high-mass star due to strong radiation pressure or to a black hole in the case of a neutron star.

Derivation for a uniform sphere
The gravitational binding energy of a sphere with radius  is found by imagining that it is pulled apart by successively moving spherical shells to infinity, the outermost first, and finding the total energy needed for that.

Assuming a constant density , the masses of a shell and the sphere inside it are:

and

The required energy for a shell is the negative of the gravitational potential energy:

Integrating over all shells yields:

Since  is simply equal to the mass of the whole divided by its volume for objects with uniform density, therefore

And finally, plugging this into our result leads to

Negative mass component
Two bodies, placed at the distance R from each other and reciprocally not moving, exert a gravitational force on a third body slightly smaller when R is small. This can be seen as a negative mass component of the system, equal, for uniformly spherical solutions, to:

For example, the fact that Earth is a gravitationally-bound sphere of its current size costs  of mass (roughly one fourth the mass of Phobos – see above for the same value in Joules), and if its atoms were sparse over an arbitrarily large volume the Earth would weigh its current mass plus  kilograms (and its gravitational pull over a third body would be accordingly stronger).

It can be easily demonstrated that this negative component can never exceed the positive component of a system. A negative binding energy greater than the mass of the system itself would indeed require that the radius of the system be smaller than:

which is smaller than  its Schwarzschild radius:

and therefore never visible to an external observer. However this is only a Newtonian approximation and in relativistic conditions other factors must be taken into account as well.

Non-uniform spheres
Planets and stars have radial density gradients from their lower density surfaces to their much denser compressed cores. Degenerate matter objects (white dwarfs; neutron star pulsars) have radial density gradients plus relativistic corrections.

Neutron star relativistic equations of state include a graph of radius vs. mass for various models. The most likely radii for a given neutron star mass are bracketed by models AP4 (smallest radius) and MS2 (largest radius). BE is the ratio of gravitational binding energy mass equivalent to observed neutron star gravitational mass of M with radius R, 

Given current values

and the star mass M expressed relative to the solar mass,

then the relativistic fractional binding energy of a neutron star is

See also
Stress–energy tensor
Stress–energy–momentum pseudotensor
Nordtvedt effect

References

Binding energy
Binding energy